Roger Wayne Archie Dermont (born 1 April 1945) is an English former first-class cricketer.

Born at Whitwell, Dermont made a single appearance in first-class cricket for the Marylebone Cricket Club (MCC) against Cambridge University at Lord's in 1967. Batting once in the match, Dermont was dismissed without scoring by Stephen Russell in the MCC first-innings, while with the ball he took two wickets in the Cambridge first-innings, dismissing Mano Ponniah and Roger Knight to finish with figures of 2/23 from nine overs. Later that same season he made his debut for Hertfordshire in minor counties cricket, playing intermittently in the Minor Counties Championship until 1974.

References

External links

1945 births
Living people
People from North Hertfordshire District
English cricketers
Marylebone Cricket Club cricketers
Hertfordshire cricketers